Anegada  is the northernmost of the British Virgin Islands (BVI), a group of islands that form part of the archipelago of the Virgin Islands. Anegada is the only inhabited British Virgin Island formed from coral and limestone, rather than being of volcanic origin. While the other islands are mountainous, Anegada is flat and low.

At about 15 square miles (38 square kilometers), Anegada is the second largest of the British Virgin Islands, but it is also the most sparsely populated of the main islands, with a population of 285 as at the 2010 Census. Most of the population on Anegada live in the only village, The Settlement.

Economy

The primary business of Anegada is tourism. On a typical day during the tourist season, the island will have an additional 200 or so visitors. Commercial fishing is also a substantial business on Anegada, with local fishermen providing the majority of the fresh fish and lobster catch for the rest of the British Virgin Islands. Its miles of south shore flats have a large population of bonefish, making Anegada a popular destination for fly fishing.

From 2008 to 2013 Anegada was home to one of the tallest Christmas trees in the Caribbean and had an official tree lighting ceremony and party each year. The tree donated by Adrian Johnson was intended to help bring visitors to the island and provided a flotilla destination for many sailors.

Access
Access to the island is via the small Auguste George Airport (NGD), thrice-weekly ferries, and private boat. Charter flights run directly to Anegada from Tortola and Virgin Gorda, in the BVI, as well as San Juan, St. Thomas, Antigua and St. Maarten.

Horseshoe Reef
Anegada is known for miles of white sand beaches and the -long Horseshoe Reef, one of the largest barrier coral reefs in the Caribbean. The reef makes navigation to Anegada difficult. While charter boats freely sail among most of the other Virgin Islands, charter companies often forbid clients to sail to Anegada to avoid running aground on the reef.

The reef has caused hundreds of shipwrecks, including HMS Astraea  in 1808, the Donna Paula (1819), and the MS Rocus (1929) As such, it was once an important scuba diving destination. In an effort to protect the reef, the BVI government has made anchoring on Horseshoe Reef illegal.

Fauna

Anegada is also known for the large salt ponds that cover much of the west end of the island, These ponds, which support unique fauna, were designated a Ramsar Site on 11 May 1999. In the 1830s, thousands of Caribbean flamingos lived in these ponds, but they were hunted for food and feathers throughout the 19th and early 20th centuries and disappeared by 1950. They have been reestablished. As of 2016, the flamingo flock numbers approximately 200 birds. The birds are another tourist draw, but officials are trying to keep the number of visitors to the flamingo areas at a level that allows the birds to flourish. The western salt ponds and south-eastern coastal mangroves have been recognised as an Important Bird Area (IBA) by BirdLife International.

Other rare or endangered animals include the Anegada rock iguana (Cyclura pinguis) and several species of turtles. Conch, Caribbean lobster (Metanephrops binghami), and many species of fishes can be found near Anegada, particularly in the deep waters off the North Drop to the north of the island.

The Ft. Worth Zoo now maintains an Anegada Rock "Headstart" facility in the Settlement. Newly hatched iguanas are caught in the wild, brought to the facility, and raised until they are large enough to be able to defend themselves against the feral cats that are their only predator on Anegada. As of 2016, over 200 iguanas have been released from the headstart program back into the wild. In addition, an annual Iguana Festival is held outside the Iguana Headstart Facility to celebrate the island's native species.

The reef adjacent to the Settlement was once one of the more fertile conch grounds in the Caribbean, but overfishing has wiped out the conch population there. Visitors to the settlement are greeted by the sight of mountains of empty conch shells on the shore when they arrive.

There are also populations of feral cattle, donkeys, goats, cows, and sheep that live in all areas of the island.

Hurricanes

Anegadians traditionally endured hurricanes by tying their dories to the trunks of mangroves with rope and covering with a tarp. Today, given sufficient warning, few leave the island and go to Tortola until after the storm passes.

The close passage led to significant damage on the island, with major flooding on the south side from the storm surge and breaking waves. The north side of the island experienced no storm surge, and Horseshoe Reef protected the north side of the island from breaking waves. 24 hours before the storm arrived, the forecast was for the storm to pass well to the north. By the time that it was apparent that the hurricane was going to have a major impact, all transportation service from Anegada (air and ferry) had been suspended. There were no reported serious injuries to anyone on the island.

The northern eye wall of Irma passed directly over Anegada, causing major damage on the island. Some people evacuated to Tortola before the storm struck, but most people remained on the island. There was some flooding on the south side from the storm surge and breaking waves. The north side of the island experienced no storm surge, and Horseshoe Reef protected the north side of the island from breaking waves. There were no reported serious injuries to anyone on the island.

Education

Approximately 70 students attend school at the Claudia Creque Educational Centre, formerly Anegada Primary and Secondary School. This self-contained school is the only school on Anegada and handles pre-school, primary, and secondary levels. It is funded and operated by the British Virgin Islands government.

See also
 List of lighthouses in the British Virgin Islands

References

External links

 
Ramsar sites in British Overseas Territories
Former English colonies
Lighthouses in the British Virgin Islands
Seabird colonies
Important Bird Areas of the British Virgin Islands